Cedro de São João is a municipality located in the Brazilian state of Sergipe. Its population was 5,913 (2020) and its area is 80 km².

References

Municipalities in Sergipe